Agatha of Sicily is a Christian saint.

Sainte-Agathe or St. Agatha may refer to the following places:

 St. Agatha, a rural community in Wilmot, Ontario, Canada
 Ste. Agathe, Manitoba, Canada, an unincorporated community
 Sainte-Agathe, Puy-de-Dôme, Thiers, France, a commune
 St. Agatha, Maine, United States, a town

See also
 Sainte-Agathe-de-Lotbinière, Quebec
 Sainte-Agathe-des-Monts, Quebec
 Sant'Agata (disambiguation)